The 1997 Salem Open was a men's tennis tournament played on outdoor hard courts in Hong Kong that was part of the World Series of the 1997 ATP Tour. It was the 22nd edition of the tournament and was held from 7 April through 132 April 1997. First-seeded Michael Chang won the singles title.

Finals

Singles
 Michael Chang defeated  Patrick Rafter, 6–3, 6–3
 It was Chang's 3rd singles title of the year and the 23rd of his career.

Doubles
 Martin Damm /  Daniel Vacek defeated  Karsten Braasch /  Jeff Tarango, 6–3, 6–4

References

External links
 ITF tournament edition details

Salem Open
1997
1997 in Hong Kong sport
1997 in Chinese tennis